William Groseclose (born October 27, 1858, date of death unknown) was an American golfer. He competed in the men's individual event at the 1904 Summer Olympics.

References

1858 births
Year of death missing
Amateur golfers
American male golfers
Olympic golfers of the United States
Golfers at the 1904 Summer Olympics
People from Salisbury, North Carolina
Sportspeople from North Carolina